Chłopków  is a village in the administrative district of Gmina Platerów, within Łosice County, Masovian Voivodeship, in east-central Poland.

The village has an approximate population of 270.

References

Villages in Łosice County